Samantha Newark (born 27 June 1967) is an English-born American musician, singer and actress. She is best known for her voice-over work as the speaking voice of Jem and Jerrica in the animated cartoon series Jem. As a teenager, Newark became a voice-over talent in mainstream television. Her work on "Jem" produced a serious cult following that persists to this day. She lent her voice to many radio and TV projects while writing and performing her original music as a solo recording artist in Los Angeles CA, Nashville TN and Dallas, Texas. In 2015 Newark appeared in the live action feature film adaptation on Jem and the Holograms directed by Jon Chu.

Early years
Samantha Newark was born in Wimbledon, London. Although she was born in England, her family then moved to Africa and later to the US. She attended several different schools and began her music career in Africa after seeing Lena Zavaroni perform. She continued working as an actress and singer and came to prominence when she landed the role of Jem in 1985.

Acting career
Newark is best known for her voice-over work on the animated 1980s cartoon series Jem as the speaking voice of Jerrica/Jem (Britta Phillips was the singing voice). "Jem" remains her most well known role and Newark receives invitations to meet the Jem fans at Pop Culture conventions all over the world. Newark made a cameo appearance in the Jem and the Holograms live action film adaptation.

Newark was nominated for a "Young Artist award" twice for "Exceptional young actress in animation, series, specials, or film features" also nominated for her performance in "Best animated series". Other voice-over credits include guest-starring on the original Transformers cartoon as "Ariel" in the classic Transformers episode "War Dawn" and in other episodes playing Elise Presser. Newark was also cast as the voice of a young Peter Pan's mother in Steven Spielberg feature film  Hook as well as doing countless on camera and voice-over TV and radio commercials. She also played the role of Debbie in the 1987 thriller film Summer Camp Nightmare. In 2012 she was invited to contribute two characters to the Festival favorite animated short Pound Dogs, created by Mike Salva. This project won the MTV "Voice and Vision animation award for writing and animation and garnered two development deals with MTV.

Newark also works in video games, providing voices for games including Twisted Metal: Black and Britney's Dance Beat, where she played the roles of the Choreographer and the Asian dancer.

Music career
Newark began her professional music career at the age of seven. Signed to Nitty Gritty records she recorded her first record while living in Africa and then toured to support her single "Jimmy Jimbo" produced by Allan Goldswain and Mike Adams. At age 10 she and her family immigrated to America and Samantha was promptly signed to International Creative Management where she was thrust onto the State fair circuit opening for Eddie Rabbitt, Pat Boone, Debby Boone and Mac Davis. She was cast in the title role in the United States Navy band production of the musical Annie in Washington DC. and eventually moved with her family to Burbank California where she played Rosie in a production of Sweet Charity and Dorothy in a Los Angeles production of The Wizard of Oz She was a frequent performer of The L.A. Kids cabaret and performed often with the Ray Anthony orchestra at the famous Shrine Auditorium and on many telethons. She also was a featured guest vocalist at age 14 with the 65 piece Los Angeles Pops orchestra. She won the Los Angeles vocal competition at the age of 17 and then through the late 1990s started to write and record her own original music with many different incarnations of original bands.

Newark sang the theme song for the anime classic film Project A-ko and worked with Richie Zito and Joey Carbone and was hired to sing multiple songs on the soundtrack for the movie Crazy Six starring Rob Lowe, Burt Reynolds, Mario Van Peebles.

She was one of the 20 finalists out of 10,000 submissions for the Lilith Fair talent contest sponsored by Star 98.7 radio and Universal contests in 1999.  And was one of 15 budding songwriters accepted into the coveted Lester Sill Ascap songwriting workshop where she met writer producer and long time collaborator composer Mike Reagan She and Mike worked together through the late 1990s writing original music performing live and contributing vocals for various PlayStation games. She sang vocals on the movie soundtrack Some Girl starring Juliette Lewis and also sang vocals in the movie Material Girls.

While living in Los Angeles she worked as a session singer for writer, producer Michele Vice Maslin. She has worked in the EDM world co-writing a song called "Deeper" for the German group Fragma. The version with her vocals was remixed by EDM producer Nick Terranova. In late 2006 she auditioned for Julian Coryell to be a backup singer for Leonard Cohen. The project was set to do a world tour and after two months of rehearsals the tour was cancelled and put on hold for two years where it started up again with a new MD and new team.

Newark made her move to Music city Nashville in Tennessee in October 2007. She released her self-titled debut album in 2008. Songs from the album have been featured in numerous television programs including Smallville, Reba, Life is Wild, and Gossip Girl, America's Next Top Model, as well as MTV's Laguna Beach, Punk'd, and My Super Sweet 16.

In 2008, Newark was invited to be a part of the documentary film "Saravia" written and directed by Joaquin Montalvan about the spiritual journey into the life of painter, writer and composer Mauricio Saravia. Newark and Saravia met in Los Angeles and worked closely together on the soundtrack for the film. Newark composed the melodies for Saravia's poetry that was featured throughout the film and she performed one of the songs live in the movie.

Newark released her second album Somethin' Good in late October 2011, with songs written and performed by Newark and produced by Dave Polich, Michael Jackson's keyboard programmer on the "This Is It" concerts. Her third album, Hologram described as a "love letter" to her many fans, was scheduled for release in November 2016 and final debut in 2017.  A dance music version of this album, Hologram 2.0, was released in late 2021 and included remixes by musical artists Hyperbubble and Jipsta.

Filmography

Film

Television

Video games

References

External links
Official Samantha Newark Homepage

 Official YouTube channel

1967 births
Living people
English expatriates in the United States
English women pop singers
English rock singers
English video game actresses
English voice actresses
Glam rock musicians
Musicians from Burbank, California
Musicians from Dallas
Musicians from Nashville, Tennessee
People from Wimbledon, London
20th-century English actresses
21st-century English actresses
20th-century English women singers
20th-century English singers
21st-century English women singers
21st-century English singers